Ankh wedja seneb is an Egyptian phrase which often appears after the names of pharaohs, in references to their household, or at the ends of letters. The formula consists of three Egyptian hieroglyphs without clarification of pronunciation, making its exact grammatical form difficult to reconstruct. It may be expressed as "life, prosperity, and health", but Alan Gardiner proposed that they represented verbs in the stative form: "Be alive, strong, and healthy".

Components
Egyptian hieroglyphs did not record vowel values, making the exact pronunciation of most words unknowable.

Ankh means "life" and "to have life", "to live", particularly with regard to the longevity and resurrection of the ancient Egyptian deities and pharaohs
Wedja means "to be whole" or "intact", with connotations of "prosperity" and "well-being" 
Seneb means "to be sound", "to be well", "to be healthy"

Rosetta Stone
On the Rosetta Stone (196 BCE), the gods are said to reward the Ptolemaic pharaoh Ptolemy V Epiphanes:

See also
 Ankh

References

Citations

Bibliography
, reprinted at Berlin by Akademie-Verlag GmbH in 1971. 
 .

Egyptian words and phrases
Egyptian hieroglyphs